Evelyn Domenica Berckman (18 October 1900 – 18 September 1978) was an American writer noted for her detective and Gothic horror novels. In addition to her novels and screenplays, she also wrote four non-fiction titles about British naval history.

Personal life
Born in Philadelphia, Pennsylvania, Berckman was the daughter of woolen goods merchant Aaron Berkman and his wife Hannah who emigrated to the United States in 1891 and from 1900 to 1936 resided in Germantown a suburb some seven miles from downtown Philadelphia.

After attending the Eastman School of Music in Rochester, New York, where she was a contemporary of Aaron Copland among others, Berckman spent the 1930s in New York City, living in East 60th Street on the city's Upper East Side. She worked as a piano teacher, and as a pianist and composer, before this career was curtailed by paralysis brought on by arduous sessions of piano practice. Her compositions were performed, amongst others by the Pro Arte Quartet and the Philadelphia Orchestra.

Her first novel, The Evil of Time, was published in 1954. Berckman made several visits to London, staying for extended periods in various Mayfair hotels while she wrote, building up a second career "to avoid the threat of poverty". In 1960 she moved to the city permanently, settling in the Kensington area and living at various addresses until her death from heart disease in 1978.

Research for her books brought her in contact with art historian Rupert Gunnis, to whom she dedicated her 1967 novel The Heir of Starvelings, an apparently true story which she based on anecdotal information from Gunnis.

Fiction
 The Evil of Time, Dodd 1954 
 The Beckoning Dream, Dodd 1955 (filmed for television as Worse Than Murder, 1960, with Boris Karloff and Constance Ford)
 The Strange Bedfellow, Dodd 1956
 The Blind Villain / House of Terror Dodd 1957
 The Hovering Darkness, Dodd 1957
 No Known Grave, Dodd 1958
 Lament for Four Brides, Dodd 1959
 Do You Know This Voice?,  Dodd 1960
 Blind Girl's Buff, Dodd 1962
 A Thing That Happens to You, Dodd 1964
 Keys From a Window, Eyre & Spottiswoode, 1965
 A Simple Case of Ill-Will, Dodd 1965
 Stalemate, Doubleday 1966
 The Heir of Starvelings, ('A Novel of Innocence and Evil'),  Doubleday 1967
 A Case in Nullity, Doubleday 1968 (also published as A Hidden Malice)
 The Long Arm of the Prince, Hale 1968
 She Asked for It, Doubleday 1969
 The Voice of Air, Doubleday 1970
 A Finger to Her Lips, Doubleday 1971
 The Fourth Man on the Rope, Doubleday 1972
 The Stake in the Game, Doubleday 1973
 The Hidden Island. Hamish Hamilton 1973
 The Victorian Album, ('A Novel of Possession'), Doubleday 1973
 Wait, Just You Wait, Doubleday 1974. (Published as Wait, Hamish Hamilton, London, 1973)
 The Nightmare Chase, Doubleday 1975. (Published as Indecent Exposure, Hamish Hamilton, London, 1975)
 The Crown Estate, Doubleday 1976. (Published as The Blessed Plot, Hamish Hamilton. London, 1976)
 Journey's End, Doubleday 1977. (Published as Be All and End All, Hamish Hamilton, London, 1976)

Non-fiction
 Nelson's Dear Lord: A Portrait of St. Vincent, Hamish Hamilton, London, 1962
 Hidden Navy, Hamish Hamilton, 1973
 Creators and Destroyers of the English Navy, Hamish Hamilton, London, 1974
 Victims of Piracy: Admiralty Court, 1575–1678, Hamish Hamilton, London, 1979

Reception

References

External links
 

1900 births
1978 deaths
20th-century American novelists
American classical pianists
American women classical pianists
American women classical composers
American classical composers
Writers from Philadelphia
American women screenwriters
Eastman School of Music alumni
20th-century classical composers
American naval historians
American expatriates in England
Women military writers
American women novelists
20th-century American women writers
20th-century American historians
20th-century classical pianists
20th-century American pianists
20th-century American women pianists
20th-century American composers
Novelists from Pennsylvania
Screenwriters from Pennsylvania
Historians from Pennsylvania
American women historians
American mystery novelists
20th-century American screenwriters
20th-century women composers